In physics, coherence length is the propagation distance over which a coherent wave (e.g. an electromagnetic wave) maintains a specified degree of coherence.  Wave interference is strong when the paths taken by all of the interfering waves differ by less than the coherence length. A wave with a longer coherence length is closer to a perfect sinusoidal wave. Coherence length is important in holography and telecommunications engineering.

This article focuses on the coherence of classical electromagnetic fields.  In quantum mechanics, there is a mathematically analogous concept of the quantum coherence length of a wave function.

Formulas

In radio-band systems, the coherence length is approximated by

In optical communications and optical coherence tomography (OCT), assuming that the source has a Gaussian emission spectrum, the roundtrip coherence length  is given by 

If the source has a Gaussian spectrum with FWHM spectral width , then a path offset of  will reduce the fringe visibility to 50%. It is important to note that this is a roundtrip coherence length — this definition is applied in applications like OCT where the light traverses the measured displacement twice (as in a Michelson interferometer). In transmissive applications, such as with a Mach–Zehnder interferometer, the light traverses the displacement only once, and the coherence length is effectively doubled.

The coherence length can also be measured using a Michelson interferometer and is the optical path length difference of a self-interfering laser beam which corresponds to  fringe visibility, where the fringe visibility is defined as

where  is the fringe intensity.

In long-distance transmission systems, the coherence length may be reduced by propagation factors such as dispersion, scattering, and diffraction.

Lasers

Multimode helium–neon lasers have a typical coherence length on the order of centimeters, while the coherence length of longitudinally single-mode lasers can exceed 1 km. Semiconductor lasers can reach some 100 m, but small, inexpensive semiconductor lasers have shorter lengths, with one source claiming 20 cm. Singlemode fiber lasers with linewidths of a few kHz can have coherence lengths exceeding 100 km. Similar coherence lengths can be reached with optical frequency combs due to the narrow linewidth of each tooth. Non-zero visibility is present only for short intervals of pulses repeated after cavity length distances up to this long coherence length.

Other light sources
Tolansky's An introduction to Interferometry has a chapter on sources which quotes a line width of around 0.052 angstroms for each of the Sodium D lines in an uncooled low-pressure sodium lamp, corresponding to a coherence length of around 67 mm for each line by itself. Cooling the low pressure sodium discharge to liquid nitrogen temperatures increases the individual D line coherence length by a factor of 6.  A very narrow-band interference filter would be required to isolate an individual D line.

See also

 Coherence time
 Superconducting coherence length
 Spatial coherence

References

 

Electromagnetic radiation
Physical optics
Waves